Unicorn Pursuivant of Arms in Ordinary is a current Scottish pursuivant of arms in Ordinary of the Court of the Lord Lyon.

The title was created after 1381, and derived from the unicorn.  One of these beasts is used as a supporter for the royal arms of Scotland, and as a royal badge.

The badge of office is A unicorn couchant Argent, horded, unguled, maned and tufted Or gorged of a coronet of four fleurs-de-lys (two visible) and four crosses pattee (one and two halves visible) Or.

The office is currently held by Roderick Alexander Macpherson

Holders of the office

See also
Officer of Arms
Pursuivant
Court of the Lord Lyon
Heraldry Society of Scotland

References

External links
The Court of the Lord Lyon

Court of the Lord Lyon
Offices of arms